Raymond Joseph Meyer (December 18, 1913 – March 17, 2006) was an American men's collegiate basketball coach from Chicago, Illinois. He was well known for coaching at DePaul University from 1942 to 1984, compiling a 724–354 record. Meyer coached DePaul to 21 post-season appearances (13 NCAA, eight NIT). In total, Meyer recorded 37 winning seasons and twelve 20-win seasons, including seven straight from 1978 to 1984. Two Meyer-coached teams reached the Final Four (1943 and 1979), and in 1945, Meyer led DePaul past Bowling Green to capture the National Invitation Tournament, the school's only post-season title. 

Meyer coached a College All-Star team that played a coast-to-coast series against the Harlem Globetrotters for 11 years. One of his best players was George Mikan, who was a game-changing player and basketball's first great "big man". Meyer recruited Mikan from Archbishop Quigley Preparatory Seminary, a school Meyer had himself earlier attended. Other top players coached by Meyer include former NBA players Mark Aguirre and Terry Cummings.  During Meyer's tenure the basketball rivalry between DePaul and Loyola reached an extremely high level. Meyer's great-great nephew, Mike Starkman, played basketball for Loyola as a walk-on.  Meyer was a much-beloved figure in Chicago, and is a member of the Naismith Memorial Basketball Hall of Fame.

Meyer's final game as a head coach was the Blue Demons' 73–71 overtime loss to Wake Forest in the NCAA Midwest Regional semifinals at St. Louis Arena on March 23, 1984. Two of his sons were also NCAA Division I men's basketball head coaches. Tom Meyer served at the University of Illinois at Chicago for six years from 1977 to his dismissal on April 16, 1983. Joey Meyer took the helm of the Blue Demons upon his father's retirement and stayed at DePaul until his resignation on April 28, 1997.

Meyer also ran a summer basketball camp near Three Lakes in northern Wisconsin for many years.

Meyer died at age 92 at the Addolorata Villa assisted living facility in Wheeling, Illinois on March 17, 2006.

Head coaching record

See also
 Chicagoland Sports Hall of Fame
 List of college men's basketball coaches with 600 wins
 List of NCAA Division I Men's Final Four appearances by coach

References

External links
 

1913 births
2006 deaths
Amateur Athletic Union men's basketball players
American men's basketball coaches
American men's basketball players
Basketball coaches from Illinois
Basketball players from Chicago
College men's basketball head coaches in the United States
DePaul Blue Demons athletic directors
DePaul Blue Demons men's basketball coaches
Naismith Memorial Basketball Hall of Fame inductees
National Collegiate Basketball Hall of Fame inductees
Notre Dame Fighting Irish men's basketball players
People from Three Lakes, Wisconsin